Yash Soni (born 16 October 1996) is an Indian theater and film actor. He debuted in cinema with Chello Divas (2015) which was the highest grossing Gujarati film at the time and was widely considered as one of the best Gujarati films. He later starred in films like Days of Tafree (2016), Shu Thayu? (2018). He then starred in  Chaal Jeevi Laiye! (2019) alongside Siddharth Randeria, which became the highest grossing Gujarati film.

Career
Soni debuted in Gujarati cinema in 2015 with Chhello Divas directed by Krishnadev Yagnik which was declared hit and he was praised for his performance. Later he acted in some experimental and commercial theatre productions.

In 2016, he debuted in Bollywood (Hindi cinema) with Days of Tafree, the Hindi remake of Chhello Divas, directed by Yagnik. He again collaborated with Yagnik in another commercially successful Gujarati film Shu Thayu? (2018). In 2019, he starred in Chaal Jeevi Laiye! in lead role which became the highest grossing Gujarati film. He will appear in Naadi Dosh (2022) and Raado, both Gujarati films written and directed by Krishnadev Yagnik.

Filmography

Films 

|2023
|' 'inspector danny jigar''
|Krishnadev Yagnik
|Gujarati

Theatre

References

External links 

Living people
Male actors in Gujarati-language films
Gujarati theatre
Gujarati people
Male actors from Ahmedabad
Indian male stage actors
Indian male film actors
21st-century Indian male actors
1996 births